Lombardy renewed its delegation to the Italian Senate on April 21, 1996. This election was a part of national Italian general election of 1996 even if, according to the Italian Constitution, every senatorial challenge in each Region is a single and independent race.

The election was won by the centre-left coalition called The Olive Tree.

Electoral system
The intricate electoral system introduced in 1993, called Mattarella Law, provided 75% of the seats in the Senate as elected by first-past-the-post system, whereas the remaining 25% was assigned by a special proportional method that actually assigned the remaining seats to minority parties.

Results

|-
|- bgcolor="#E9E9E9"
!rowspan="1" align="left" valign="top"|Coalition
!rowspan="1" align="center" valign="top"|votes
!rowspan="1" align="center" valign="top"|votes (%)
!rowspan="1" align="center" valign="top"|seats
!rowspan="1" align="left" valign="top"|Party
!rowspan="1" align="center" valign="top"|seats
!rowspan="1" align="center" valign="top"|change
|-
!rowspan="5" align="left" valign="top"|The Olive Tree
|rowspan="5" valign="top"|1,928,868
|rowspan="5" valign="top"|34.2
|rowspan="5" valign="top"|19

|align="left"|Democratic Party of the Left
|valign="top"|11
|valign="top"|8
|-
|align="left"|Italian People's Party
|valign="top"|4
|valign="top"|1
|-
|align="left"|Federation of the Greens
|valign="top"|2
|valign="top"|2
|-
|align="left"|Italian Renewal
|valign="top"|1
|valign="top"|1
|-
|align="left"|Italian Republican Party
|valign="top"|1
|valign="top"|1

|-
!rowspan="3" align="left" valign="top"|Pole for Freedoms
|rowspan="3" valign="top"|1,853,453
|rowspan="3" valign="top"|32.8
|rowspan="3" valign="top"|16

|align="left"|Forza Italia
|valign="top"|10
|valign="top"|1
|-
|align="left"|National Alliance
|valign="top"|5
|valign="top"|4
|-
|align="left"|Federalist Party
|valign="top"|1
|valign="top"|1

|-
!rowspan="1" align="left" valign="top"|Northern League
|rowspan="1" valign="top"|1,376,124
|rowspan="1" valign="top"|24.4
|rowspan="1" valign="top"|11

|align="left"|Northern League
|valign="top"|11
|valign="top"|15

|-
!rowspan="1" align="left" valign="top"|Alliance of Progressives
|rowspan="1" valign="top"|50,235
|rowspan="1" valign="top"|0.9
|rowspan="1" valign="top"|1

|align="left"|Communist Refoundation Party
|valign="top"|1
|valign="top"|1

|-
!rowspan="1" align="left" valign="top"|Others
|rowspan="1" valign="top"|437,745
|rowspan="1" valign="top"|7.7
|rowspan="1" valign="top"|-

|align="left"|Others
|valign="top"|-
|valign="top"|-

|- bgcolor="#E9E9E9"
!rowspan="1" align="left" valign="top"|Total coalitions
!rowspan="1" align="right" valign="top"|5,646,425
!rowspan="1" align="right" valign="top"|100.0
!rowspan="1" align="right" valign="top"|47
!rowspan="1" align="left" valign="top"|Total parties
!rowspan="1" align="right" valign="top"|47
!rowspan="1" align="right" valign="top"|=
|}
Sources: Ministry of the Interior, Italian Senate

Constituencies

|-
|- bgcolor="#E9E9E9"
!align="left" valign="top"|N°
!align="center" valign="top"|Constituency
!align="center" valign="top"|Winner
!align="center" valign="top"|Alliance
!align="center" valign="top"|Party
!align="center" valign="top"|Votes %
!align="center" valign="top"|Losers
|-
|align="left"|1
|align="left"|Milan Central
|align="left"|Carlo Scognamiglio
|align="center"|Pole for Freedoms
|align="left"|Forza Italia
|align="left"|47.9%
|align="left"|G. Bianchini (Olive) 35.2%  L. Rossi (League) 10.9%
|-
|align="left"|2
|align="left"|Milan East
|align="left"|Saverio Vertone
|align="center"|Pole for Freedoms
|align="left"|Forza Italia
|align="left"|46.4%
|align="left"|Vera Squarcialupi (Olive) 36.2%  G. Galimberti (League) 11.5%
|-
|align="left"|3
|align="left"|Milan West
|align="left"|Riccardo De Corato
|align="center"|Pole for Freedoms
|align="left"|National Alliance
|align="left"|46.5%
|align="left"|Felice Besostri (Olive) 35.4%  P. Arpesani (League) 11.7%
|-
|align="left"|4
|align="left"|Milan South
|align="left"|Roberto Lasagna
|align="center"|Pole for Freedoms
|align="left"|Forza Italia
|align="left"|41.5%
|align="left"|Antonio Duva (Olive) 38.6%  M. Bedoni (League) 13.1%
|-
|align="left"|5
|align="left"|Milan North
|align="left"|Leopoldo Elia
|align="center"| 
|align="left"|Italian People's Party
|align="left"|43.6%
|align="left"|L. Strik (Pannella) 23.1%  M. Frigerio (League) 16.4%
|-
|align="left"|6
|align="left"|Sesto San Giovanni
|align="left"|Antonio Pizzinato
|align="center"| 
|align="left"|Democratic Party of the Left
|align="left"|42.7%
|align="left"|Sergio Travaglia (Pole) 38.1%  C. Pedrazzini (League) 12.9%
|-
|align="left"|7
|align="left"|Lodi
|align="left"|Gianni Piatti
|align="center"|
|align="left"|Democratic Party of the Left
|align="left"|39.7%
|align="left"|Michele Bucci (Pole) 34.8%  G. Finaguerra (League) 17.2%
|-
|align="left"|8
|align="left"|Rozzano
|align="left"|Carlo Smuraglia
|align="center"| 
|align="left"|Democratic Party of the Left
|align="left"|40.8%
|align="left"|Antonino Caruso (Pole) 40.1%  G. Lombardi (League) 12.7%
|-
|align="left"|9
|align="left"|Abbiategrasso
|align="left"|Francesco Servello
|align="center"|Pole for Freedoms
|align="left"|National Alliance
|align="left"|34.4%
|align="left"|F. Bonetti (Olive) 33.0%  G. Gadda (League) 25.5%
|-
|align="left"|10
|align="left"|Rho
|align="left"|Fiorello Cortiana
|align="center"| 
|align="left"|Federation of the Greens
|align="left"|36.5%
|align="left"|F. Tofoni (Pole) 34.9%  G. Carnovali (League) 23.6%
|-
|align="left"|11
|align="left"|Bollate
|align="left"|Ornella Piloni
|align="center"| 
|align="left"|Democratic Party of the Left
|align="left"|38.1%
|align="left"|P. Balzano (Pole) 34.0%  E. Busnelli (League) 21.5%
|-
|align="left"|12
|align="left"|Cinisello Balsamo
|align="left"|Patrizia Toia
|align="center"| 
|align="left"|Italian People's Party
|align="left"|43.8%
|align="left"|Enrico Rizzi (Pole) 35.0%  G. Tronconi (League) 15.2%
|-
|align="left"|13
|align="left"|Seregno
|align="left"|Ettore Rotelli
|align="center"|Pole for Freedoms
|align="left"|Forza Italia
|align="left"|36.3%
|align="left"|M. Pulcini (Olive) 29.8%  C. Monti (League) 27.6%
|-
|align="left"|14
|align="left"|Monza
|align="left"|Alfredo Mantica
|align="center"|Pole for Freedoms
|align="left"|National Alliance
|align="left"|38.1%
|align="left"|Anna Maria Bernasconi (Olive) 37.0%  E. Merlo (League) 19.3%
|-
|align="left"|15
|align="left"|Melzo
|align="left"|Loris Maconi
|align="center"| 
|align="left"|Democratic Party of the Left
|align="left"|41.6%
|align="left"|M. Staglieno (Pole) 33.4%  S. Motta (League) 19.4%
|-
|align="left"|16
|align="left"|Cologno Monzese
|align="left"|Natale Ripamonti
|align="center"| 
|align="left"|Federation of the Greens
|align="left"|40.2%
|align="left"|Enrico Pianetta (Pole) 39.0%  C. Marchini (League) 13.8%
|-
|align="left"|17
|align="left"|Varese
|align="left"|Piero Pellicini
|align="center"|Pole for Freedoms
|align="left"|National Alliance
|align="left"|33.1%
|align="left"|M. Astuti (Olive) 29.9%  Giuseppe Leoni (League) 29.7%
|-
|align="left"|18
|align="left"|Gallarate
|align="left"|Luigi Peruzzotti
|align="center"|Northern League
|align="left"|Northern League
|align="left"|34.6%
|align="left"|G. Martinoli (Olive) 29.9%  G. Margutti (Pole) 29.2%
|-
|align="left"|19
|align="left"|Busto Arsizio
|align="left"|Antonio Tomassini
|align="center"|Pole for Freedoms
|align="left"|Forza Italia
|align="left"|32.8%
|align="left"|Francesco Speroni (League) 32.0%  M. Maggioni (Olive) 29.2%
|-
|align="left"|20
|align="left"|Como
|align="left"|Gianfranco Miglio
|align="center"|Pole for Freedoms
|align="left"|Federalist Party
|align="left"|35.2%
|align="left"|G. Peruzzo (Olive) 29.3%  G. Ostinelli (League) 27.2%
|-
|align="left"|21
|align="left"|Cantù
|align="left"|Elia Manara
|align="center"|Northern League
|align="left"|Northern League
|align="left"|32.3%
|align="left"|G. Manfredi (Pole) 31.3%  P. Giovanni (Olive) 29.5%
|-
|align="left"|22
|align="left"|Brescia
|align="left"|Alessandro Pardini
|align="center"| 
|align="left"|Democratic Party of the Left
|align="left"|38.9%
|align="left"|R. Conti (Pole) 30.6%  G. Giudici (League) 24.7%
|-
|align="left"|23
|align="left"|Lumezzane
|align="left"|Francesco Tabladini
|align="center"|Northern League
|align="left"|Northern League
|align="left"|41.8%
|align="left"|A. Gregorelli (Olive) 30.9%  L. Becchetti (Pole) 25.4%
|-
|align="left"|24
|align="left"|Desenzano del Garda
|align="left"|Giovanni Bruni
|align="center"| 
|align="left"|Italian Renewal
|align="left"|33.1%
|align="left"|Massimo Wilde (League) 31.0%  I. Formentini (Pole) 28.4%
|-
|align="left"|25
|align="left"|Chiari
|align="left"|Francesco Tirelli
|align="center"|Northern League
|align="left"|Northern League
|align="left"|32.9%
|align="left"|B. Mazzotti (Olive) 32.3%  G.Gei (Pole) 27.8%
|-
|align="left"|26
|align="left"|Suzzara
|align="left"|Piergiorgio Bergonzi
|align="center"|Alliance of Progressives
|align="left"|Communist Refoundation Party
|align="left"|34.3%
|align="left"|F. Marenghi (Pole) 30.5%  I. Maffini (League) 24.7%
|-
|align="left"|27
|align="left"|Mantua
|align="left"|Roberto Borroni
|align="center"| 
|align="left"|Democratic Party of the Left
|align="left"|43.9%
|align="left"|R. Freddi (Pole) 28.3%  A. Cattaneo (League) 20.2%
|-
|align="left"|28
|align="left"|Cremona
|align="left"|Angelo Rescaglio
|align="center"| 
|align="left"|Italian People's Party
|align="left"|38.7%
|align="left"|G. Galli (Pole) 31.9%  B. Bruttomesso (League) 21.8%
|-
|align="left"|29
|align="left"|Pavia
|align="left"|Tullio Montagna
|align="center"| 
|align="left"|Democratic Party of the Left
|align="left"|37.0%
|align="left"|G. Beccaria (Pole) 34.6%  L. Verderio (League) 19.2%
|-
|align="left"|30
|align="left"|Vigevano
|align="left"|Domenico Contestabile
|align="center"|Pole for Freedoms
|align="left"|Forza Italia
|align="left"|37.8%
|align="left"|C. Broli (Olive) 34.6%  G. Desigis (League) 19.3%
|-
|align="left"|31
|align="left"|Bergamo
|align="left"|Giovanni Zilio
|align="center"| 
|align="left"|Italian People's Party
|align="left"|32.3%
|align="left"|Sergio Rossi (League) 31.9%  L. Caputo (Pole) 29.1%
|-
|align="left"|32
|align="left"|Albino
|align="left"|Vito Gnutti
|align="center"|Northern League
|align="left"|Northern League
|align="left"|44.8%
|align="left"|G. Giupponi (Olive) 26.7%  G. Bettera (Pole) 22.3%
|-
|align="left"|33
|align="left"|Treviglio
|align="left"|Massimo Dolazza
|align="center"|Northern League
|align="left"|Northern League
|align="left"|35.5%
|align="left"|L. Gelpi (Olive) 29.5%  M. Signorelli (Pole) 27.7%
|-
|align="left"|34
|align="left"|Sondrio
|align="left"|Fiorello Provera
|align="center"|Northern League
|align="left"|Northern League
|align="left"|36.8%
|align="left"|M. Gallo (Pole) 28.6%  R. Pedrini (Olive) 27.0%
|-
|align="left"|35
|align="left"|Lecco
|align="left"|Roberto Castelli
|align="center"|Northern League
|align="left"|Northern League
|align="left"|33.3%
|align="left"|V. Addis (Olive) 32.9%  P. Fiocchi (Pole) 27.1%
|}

Additional senators
 Pole for Freedoms
 Antonino Caruso (National Alliance, 40.1%)
 Enrico Pianetta (Forza Italia, 39.0%)
 Sergio Travaglia (Forza Italia, 38.1%)
 Enrico Rizzi (Forza Italia, 35.0%)
 Michele Bucci (Forza Italia, 34.8%)
 The Olive Tree
 Antonio Duva (Italian Republican Party, 38.6%)
 Anna Maria Bernasconi (Democratic Party of the Left, 37.0%)
 Vera Squarcialupi (Democratic Party of the Left, 36.2%)
 Felice Besostri (Democratic Party of the Left, 35.4%)
 Lega Nord
 Francesco Speroni (Lega Nord, 32.0%)
 Sergio Rossi (Lega Nord, 31.9%)
 Massimo Wilde (Lega Nord, 31.0%)

Notes

Elections in Lombardy
1996 elections in Italy